
Bushrod may refer to:

Given name
Bushrod Johnson (1817–1880), teacher, university chancellor, and Confederate general in the American Civil War
Bushrod Washington (1762–1829), U.S. Supreme Court associate justice and the nephew of George Washington
Bushrod C. Washington (1790–1851), Virginia planter and politician, orphaned nephew raised (with his brother John Augustine Washington II) by Judge Bushrod Washington
Bushrod Washington James, A.M., M.D. (1836–1903), American surgeon, homeopathist, writer, and philanthropist
Bushrod Washington Wilson (1824–1900), American pioneer and politician

Surname
Jermon Bushrod (born 1984), American football guard for the Miami Dolphins in the National Football League
Thomas Bushrod, Virginia planter and politician, progenitor of the Bushrod family which ended with Judge Bushrod Washington's mother, Hannah Bushrod

Places
Bushrod, Indiana, a community in the United States
Bushrod Island, island near Monrovia, Liberia
Bushrod Park, Oakland, California neighborhood in North Oakland, Oakland, California, United States

See also
Thomasine & Bushrod, 1974 blaxploitation film directed by Gordon Parks, Jr., written by and starring Max Julien